The 2016 ABL Playoffs is the postseason tournament concluding the 2015–16 ABL season of the ASEAN Basketball League (ABL). The top four teams that had the best regular season records qualified. The semifinals are a best-of-three series, while the Finals is a best-of-five series. The higher-seed team holds the home court advantage, hosting Games 1 and 3 in the semifinals, and Games 1, 2 and 5 in the Finals.

Bracket

Semifinals

Malaysia vs. Saigon

Singapore vs. Bangkok City

Finals

References

2015–16 ABL season
ASEAN Basketball League playoffs